Guitar Man may refer to:

Albums
 Guitar Man (Bread album), 1972
"The Guitar Man", a 1972 song from the album
 Guitar Man (George Benson album), 2011
 Guitar Man (Hank Marvin album), 2007
 Guitar Man (J.J. Cale album), 1996, or the title song
 Guitar Man (Elvis Presley album), a posthumous album by Elvis Presley, 1981

Songs
 "(Dance with the) Guitar Man", a 1962 song by Duane Eddy
 "Guitar Man" (song), a 1967 song written by Jerry Reed, covered by Elvis Presley
 "Guitar Man", a song by Kip Moore from Slowheart, 2017

Other
 The Guitar Man logo for the annual Teenage Cancer Trust concerts at Royal Albert Hall